Who Killed Doc Robin? is a 1931 British short comedy film directed by W.P. Kellino and starring Clifford Heatherley, Dorrie Deane and Dennis Wyndham.

It was made as a quota quickie by Gainsborough Pictures at the company's Islington Studios.

Cast
 Clifford Heatherley - Luigi Scarlatti
 Dorrie Deane - Sadie Sucker
 Dennis Wyndham - Pat O'Callaghan
 Ben Welden
 Queenie Leonard
 Billy Milton

References

Bibliography
 Chibnall, Steve. Quota Quickies: The Birth of the British 'B' Film. British Film Institute, 2007.
 Low, Rachael. Filmmaking in 1930s Britain. George Allen & Unwin, 1985.
 Wood, Linda. British Films, 1927-1939. British Film Institute, 1986.

External links
 

1931 films
1931 comedy films
British black-and-white films
British comedy short films
Islington Studios films
Gainsborough Pictures films
Quota quickies
1930s English-language films
1930s British films